Jean McKishnie Blewett (pen name, Katherine Kent; 4 November 1862 – 19 August 1934) was a Canadian journalist, author and poet.

Biography

Blewett was born Janet McKinshie in Scotia, Kent County, Ontario in 1862 to Scottish immigrants (some sources say 1872). Eve Brodlique was her cousin. 

She attended St. Thomas Collegiate and in 1879, married Bassett Blewett and published her first novel, Out of the Depths. In 1896, she won a  prize from the Chicago Times-Herald for her poem "Spring".

Blewett was a regular contributor to The Globe, a Toronto newspaper and in 1898, became editor of its Homemakers Department. In 1919, assisted by the Imperial Order of the Daughters of the Empire, she published a booklet titled Heart Stories to benefit war charities. During this time, she regularly lectured on topics such as temperance and women's suffrage. She used the pseudonym "Katherine Kent" for some of her writing.

In 1925, Blewett was compelled by ill-health to retire her editorship. For two years, she lived with a daughter in Lethbridge, Alberta, before returning to Toronto in 1927. She died in 1934 in Chatham, Ontario.

After her death, fellow female journalist Bride Broder wrote in tribute:

Her brother, Archie P. McKishnie, was also a noted writer.

Selected works
Out of the depths (novel). 1879 or 1890.

Notes

References

External links
 
 
 
Blewett, Jean (McKishnie) National Historic Person, Parks Canada
 Blewett in SFU Digitized Collections, Simon Fraser University, Coll. Canada's Early Women Writers (with photograph)

1862 births
1934 deaths
Canadian women poets
Canadian women novelists
Canadian women journalists
Persons of National Historic Significance (Canada)
Canadian suffragists
Canadian temperance activists
19th-century Canadian novelists
19th-century Canadian poets
20th-century Canadian poets
20th-century Canadian women writers
19th-century Canadian women writers
Pseudonymous women writers
Canadian women non-fiction writers
19th-century pseudonymous writers
20th-century pseudonymous writers